2 Lyncis is a binary star system in the northern constellation Lynx. It is visible to the naked eye, having an apparent visual magnitude of 4.44. It is moving closer to the Sun with a heliocentric radial velocity of −2 km/s.

This is a spectroscopic binary star system with an orbital period of around 3.6 years and an eccentricity of 0.5. It is classified as a probable (91% chance) eclipsing binary with the variable star designation UZ Lyn, showing a net magnitude decrease of 0.3 during an occultation.

The primary component is an A-type main-sequence star with a stellar classification of A2 Vs, where the 's' indicates narrow (sharp) absorption lines.  The orbiting companion may be the source of the X-ray emission from this system, as stars similar to the primary component do not generally produce detectable levels of X-rays.

References

A-type main-sequence stars
Eclipsing binaries
Lynx (constellation)
Lyncis, 02
Durchmusterung objects
043378
030060
2238
Lyncis, UZ